Musuyu Kutama (born 27 April 1963) is a Congolese judoka. He competed in the men's half-middleweight event at the 1992 Summer Olympics.

References

1963 births
Living people
Democratic Republic of the Congo male judoka
Olympic judoka of the Democratic Republic of the Congo
Judoka at the 1992 Summer Olympics
Place of birth missing (living people)